Oyster Pond River, also called Oyster Creek, is a  river in Chatham, Massachusetts on Cape Cod.

The river is an estuary connecting Oyster Pond with Stage Harbor, averaging  in depth and bordered with salt marshes. Both river and pond provide excellent anchorage.

Oyster Pond
The Chatham Railroad Depot was built in 1896 when Chatham was the last town on Cape Cod to get railroad service. The direct rail access caused a tourist boom in Chatham. Many elegant summer homes were built near Oyster Pond. The Louis Brandeis House, one such summer home, is now a National Historical Landmark.

Kenneth O. Emery (1914–1998) of Woods Hole Oceanographic Institution wrote a classic monograph on Oyster Pond entitled A Coastal Pond Studied by Oceanographic Methods, published by Elsevier in 1969. The monograph gives a detailed description of the pond in terms of topography, geology, hydrology, and biology. The pond lost all of its oysters in the late 1800s when the pond's entrance to Stage Harbor was filled in to make way for a railroad. In the late 1960s Oyster Pond was 25 hectares in area with an average depth of 3 meters and an average salinity of about 1.7 grams of salt per kilogram of pond water. Many studies of the pond have been made. The Oyster Pond Environmental Trust (OPET) was formed for the environmental preservation of Oyster Pond and its ecological systems.

References 

 Massachusetts Estuaries Project

Chatham, Massachusetts
Rivers of Barnstable County, Massachusetts
Estuaries of Massachusetts
Rivers of Massachusetts
Estuaries of Barnstable County, Massachusetts